Phichai is the southernmost district (amphoe) of Uttaradit province, northern Thailand.

Geography
Neighboring districts are (from the north clockwise) Tron, Thong Saen Khan of Uttaradit Province, Wat Bot, Phrom Phiram of Phitsanulok province, Sawankhalok and Si Nakhon of Sukhothai province

History
Mueang Phichai is believed to have been built in the 15th century on order of King Trailokanat as a frontier town fortified with a wall and moat. However, almost no traces of this historic town survived, only the old chedi in Wat Nah Phrathat dates back to this time.

Being one of the major towns in the north for centuries, the town was moved to a new site further north in 1887, which was renamed Uttaradit in 1915. The area around the old town Phichai was reduced to a district.

Administration
The district is divided into 11 sub-districts (tambon), which are further subdivided into 97 villages (muban). There are two townships (thesaban tambon), Tha Sak and Nai Mueang, both covering parts of the same-named tambon. There are a further 11 tambon administrative organizations (TAO).

External links
Phichai at amphoe.com (Thai)
Phichai information of the Non-Formal Education Commission (Thai)

Phichai